The men's 3 metre springboard competition of the diving events at the 2011 World Aquatics Championships was held on July 21 with the preliminary round and the semifinals and the final on 22 July.

Medalists

Results
The preliminary round was held at 09:00, and the semifinal was held at 14:00 on 21 July. The final was held at 17:00 on 22 July.

Green denotes finalists

Blue denotes semifinalists

References

External links
2011 World Aquatics Championships: Men's 3 m springboard start list, from OmegaTiming.com; retrieved 2011-07-17.

Men's 3 m springboard